Khokhra Par may refer to:
The town of Khokhrapar in Sindh, Pakistan, near the Indian border
The Khokhra Par (neighborhood) of Malir Town in Karachi, Sindh